The 1972 European Athletics Indoor Championships were held between 11–12 March 1972 in Grenoble, France.

The track used for the championships was 180 metres long.

Medal summary

Men

Women

Medal table

Participating nations

 (6)
 (4)
 (9)
 (17)
 (7)
 (12)
 (7)
 (38)
 (17)
 (3)
 (6)
 (1)
 (11)
 (2)
 (1)
 (23)
 (12)
 (32)
 (5)
 (6)
 (6)
 (34)
 (5)

References

 Results - men at GBR Athletics
 Results - women at GBR Athletics
 Detailed results at Die Leichtatletik-Statistik-Seite

External links
 EAA

 
European Athletics Indoor Championships
European Indoor Championships
European Athletics Indoor Championships
Sports competitions in Grenoble
International athletics competitions hosted by France
20th century in Grenoble
March 1972 sports events in Europe